Claymont may refer to:

 Claymont, Delaware, U.S.
 Claymont, Lexington, a neighborhood in Lexington, Kentucky, U.S.
 Claymont (SEPTA station), Delaware, U.S.
 Claymont Elementary School in Ballwin, Mississippi, U.S.
 Claymont High School in Uhrichsville, Ohio, U.S.
 Claymont Stone School, a historic schoolhouse in Claymont, Delaware, U.S.
  Claymont Elementary School in Claymont, Delaware, U.S.